Tantalus was a Greek mythological figure, most famous for his punishment in Tartarus: he was made to stand in a pool of water beneath a fruit tree with low branches, with the fruit ever eluding his grasp, and the water always receding before he could take a drink. He was also called Atys.

He was the father of Pelops, Niobe and Broteas, and was a son of Zeus and the nymph Plouto. Thus, like other heroes in Greek mythology such as Theseus (his great-great-grandson) and the Dioskouroi, Tantalus had both a hidden, divine parent and a mortal one.

The Greeks used the proverb "Tantalean punishment" in reference to those who have good things but are not permitted to enjoy them. His name and punishment are also the source of the English word tantalize, meaning to torment with the sight of something desired but out of reach; tease by arousing expectations that are repeatedly disappointed.

Etymology
Plato in the Cratylus (395e) interprets  as  [acc. :  in the original], "who has to bear much" from  "wretched".

The word  is held by some to be inherited from Proto-Indo-European, although R. S. P. Beekes rejects an Indo-European interpretation.

Historical background

There may have been a historical Tantalus, possibly the ruler of an Anatolian city named "Tantalís", "the city of Tantalus", or of a city named "Sipylus". Pausanias reports that there was a port under his name and a sepulcher of him "by no means obscure", in the same region.

Tantalus is sometimes referred to as "King of Phrygia", although his city was located in the western extremity of Anatolia, where Lydia was to emerge as a state before the beginning of the first millennium BC, and not in the traditional heartland of Phrygia, situated more inland. References to his son as "Pelops the Lydian" led some scholars to the conclusion that there would be good grounds for believing that he belonged to a primordial house of Lydia, but there is no doubt that he was Greek.

Other versions name his father as Tmolus, the name of a king of Lydia and, like Sipylus, of another mountain in ancient Lydia. The location of Tantalus' mortal mountain-fathers generally placed him in Lydia; and more seldom in Phrygia  or Paphlagonia, all in Asia Minor.

The identity of his wife is variously given: generally as Dione the daughter of Atlas; the Pleiad Taygete, daughter of Atlas; Eurythemista, a daughter of the river-god Xanthus; Euryanassa, daughter of Pactolus, another river-god of Anatolia, like the Xanthus; Clytia, the child of Amphidamantes; and Eupryto. Tantalus was also called the father of Dascylus.

Tantalus, through Pelops, was the progenitor of the House of Atreus, which was named after his grandson Atreus. Tantalus was also the great-grandfather of Agamemnon and Menelaus.

The geographer Strabo states that the wealth of Tantalus was derived from the mines of Phrygia and Mount Sipylus. Near Mount Sipylus are archaeological features that have been associated with Tantalus and his house since Antiquity. Near Mount Yamanlar in İzmir (ancient Smyrna), where the Lake Karagöl (Lake Tantalus) associated with the accounts surrounding him is found, is a monument mentioned by Pausanias: the tholos "tomb of Tantalus" (later Christianized as "Saint Charalambos' tomb") and another one in Mount Sipylus, and where a "throne of Pelops", an altar or bench carved in rock and conjecturally associated with his son is found.

Based on a similarity between the names Tantalus and Hantili, it has been suggested that the name Tantalus may have derived from that of these two Hittite kings.

Mythology

Tantalus became one of the inhabitants of Tartarus, the deepest portion of the Underworld, reserved for the punishment of evildoers; there Odysseus saw him. The association of Tantalus with the underworld is underscored by the names of his mother Plouto ("riches", as in gold and other mineral wealth), and grandmother, Chthonia ("earth").

Tantalus was initially known for having been welcomed to Zeus' table in Olympus, like Ixion. There, he is said to have abused Zeus' hospitality and stolen ambrosia and nectar to bring it back to his people, and revealed the secrets of the gods.

Most famously, Tantalus offered up his son, Pelops, as a sacrifice. He cut Pelops up, boiled him, and served him up in a banquet for gods in order to test their omniscience. The gods became aware of the gruesome nature of the menu, so they did not touch the offering; only Demeter, distraught by the loss of her daughter, Persephone, absentmindedly ate part of the boy's shoulder.

Clotho, one of the three Fates, was ordered by Zeus to bring the boy to life again. She collected the parts of the body and boiled them in a sacred cauldron, rebuilding his shoulder with one wrought of ivory made by Hephaestus and presented by Demeter.

The revived Pelops grew to be an extraordinarily handsome youth. The god Poseidon took him to Mount Olympus to teach him to use chariots. Later, Zeus threw Pelops out of Olympus due to his anger at Tantalus.

Tantalus's punishment for his act was to stand in a pool of water beneath a fruit tree with low branches. Whenever he reached for the fruit, the branches raised his intended meal from his grasp. Whenever he bent down to get a drink, the water receded before he could get any.

Over his head towers a threatening stone (mentioned in Pindar's 8th Isthmian ode, lines 10–12) like the one that Sisyphus is punished to roll up a hill. This fate has cursed him with eternal deprivation of nourishment.

In a different story, Tantalus was blamed for indirectly having stolen the dog made of gold created by Hephaestus (god of metals and smithing) for Rhea to watch over infant Zeus. Tantalus's friend Pandareus stole the dog and gave it to Tantalus for safekeeping. When asked later by Pandareus to return the dog, Tantalus denied that he had it, saying he "had neither seen nor heard of a golden dog." According to Robert Graves in The Greek Myths, this incident is why an enormous stone hangs over Tantalus's head. Others state that it was Tantalus who stole the dog, and gave it to Pandareus for safekeeping.

Tantalus was also the founder of the cursed House of Atreus in which variations on these atrocities continued. Misfortunes also occurred as a result of these acts, making the house the subject of many Greek tragedies. Tantalus's grave-sanctuary stood on Sipylus but honours were paid him at Argos, where local tradition claimed to possess his bones. In Lesbos, there was another hero-shrine in the small settlement of Polion and a mountain named after Tantalos.

Tantalus in art

Other characters with the same name

In Greek mythology, there are several other characters named Tantalus, minor figures and descendants of the above Tantalus. Broteas is said to have had a son named Tantalus, who ruled over either the city of Pisa in the Peloponnesus or of Lydia in present-day Turkey. This Tantalus was the first husband of Clytemnestra. He was slain by Agamemnon, King of Mycenae, who made Clytemnestra his wife. The third Tantalus was a son of Amphion and Niobe, daughter of the infamous Tantalus. The fourth Tantalus was a son of Thyestes, who was murdered by his uncle Atreus, and fed to his unsuspecting father.

See also
 Lycaon (king of Arcadia)
 Xenia (Greek), the Greek concept of hospitality, which Tantalus is described as breaking

Notes

References
Apollodorus, The Library with an English Translation by Sir James George Frazer, F.B.A., F.R.S. in 2 Volumes, Cambridge, MA, Harvard University Press; London, William Heinemann Ltd. 1921. ISBN 0-674-99135-4. Online version at the Perseus Digital Library. Greek text available from the same website.

Diodorus Siculus, The Library of History translated by Charles Henry Oldfather. Twelve volumes. Loeb Classical Library. Cambridge, Massachusetts: Harvard University Press; London: William Heinemann, Ltd. 1989. Vol. 3. Books 4.59–8. Online version at Bill Thayer's Web Site
Diodorus Siculus, Bibliotheca Historica. Vol 1–2. Immanel Bekker. Ludwig Dindorf. Friedrich Vogel. in aedibus B. G. Teubneri. Leipzig. 1888–1890. Greek text available at the Perseus Digital Library.
Euripides, The Complete Greek Drama, edited by Whitney J. Oates and Eugene O'Neill, Jr. in two volumes. 2. Orestes, translated by Robert Potter. New York. Random House. 1938. Online version at the Perseus Digital Library.
Euripides, Euripidis Fabulae. vol. 3. Gilbert Murray. Oxford. Clarendon Press, Oxford. 1913. Greek text available at the Perseus Digital Library.
Gaius Julius Hyginus, Fabulae from The Myths of Hyginus translated and edited by Mary Grant. University of Kansas Publications in Humanistic Studies. Online version at the Topos Text Project.

 Grimal, Pierre, The Dictionary of Classical Mythology, Wiley-Blackwell, 1996, . "Tantalus" p. 431
Homer, The Odyssey with an English Translation by A.T. Murray, PH.D. in two volumes. Cambridge, MA., Harvard University Press; London, William Heinemann, Ltd. 1919. . Online version at the Perseus Digital Library. Greek text available from the same website.
Hyginus, Fabulae from The Myths of Hyginus translated and edited by Mary Grant. University of Kansas Publications in Humanistic Studies. Online version at the Topos Text Project.
 pp 57–61 et passim
Pausanias, Description of Greece with an English Translation by W.H.S. Jones, Litt.D., and H.A. Ormerod, M.A., in 4 Volumes. Cambridge, MA, Harvard University Press; London, William Heinemann Ltd. 1918. . Online version at the Perseus Digital Library
Pausanias, Graeciae Descriptio. 3 vols. Leipzig, Teubner. 1903.  Greek text available at the Perseus Digital Library.
Pindar, Odes translated by Diane Arnson Svarlien. 1990. Online version at the Perseus Digital Library.
Pindar, The Odes of Pindar including the Principal Fragments with an Introduction and an English Translation by Sir John Sandys, Litt.D., FBA. Cambridge, MA., Harvard University Press; London, William Heinemann Ltd. 1937. Greek text available at the Perseus Digital Library.
Publius Ovidius Naso, Metamorphoses translated by Brookes More (1859–1942). Boston, Cornhill Publishing Co. 1922. Online version at the Perseus Digital Library.
Publius Ovidius Naso, Metamorphoses. Hugo Magnus. Gotha (Germany). Friedr. Andr. Perthes. 1892. Latin text available at the Perseus Digital Library.
 
Strabo, The Geography of Strabo. Edition by H.L. Jones. Cambridge, Mass.: Harvard University Press; London: William Heinemann, Ltd. 1924. Online version at the Perseus Digital Library.
Strabo, Geographica edited by A. Meineke. Leipzig: Teubner. 1877. Greek text available at the Perseus Digital Library.
Suida, Suda Encyclopedia translated by Ross Scaife, David Whitehead, William Hutton, Catharine Roth, Jennifer Benedict, Gregory Hays, Malcolm Heath Sean M. Redmond, Nicholas Fincher, Patrick Rourke, Elizabeth Vandiver, Raphael Finkel, Frederick Williams, Carl Widstrand, Robert Dyer, Joseph L. Rife, Oliver Phillips and many others. Online version at the Topos Text Project.

External links
 

Children of Zeus
Kings of Phrygia
Kings in Greek mythology
Condemned souls in Tartarus
Anatolian characters in Greek mythology
Deeds of Zeus